Elizabeth was an electoral district of the Legislative Assembly in the Australian state of New South Wales, created in 1981, partly replacing Phillip, and including central Sydney and nearby suburbs, alongside Lord Howe Island. It was abolished at the following redistribution in 1988 and largely replaced by the district of McKell.

Members for Elizabeth

Election results

References

Former electoral districts of New South Wales
Constituencies established in 1981
1981 establishments in Australia
Constituencies disestablished in 1988
1988 disestablishments in Australia